Sa-dong is a neighbourhood of Sangnok-gu, Ansan, Gyeonggi Province, South Korea. It is officially divided into Sa-1-dong, Sa-2-dong and Sa-3-dong.

External links
 Sa-1-dong 
 Sa-2-dong 
 Sa-3-dong 

Sangnok-gu
Neighbourhoods in Ansan